Udit Narayan (born 1 December 1955) is an Indian playback singer whose songs have been featured mainly in Hindi films. He has also sung in various other languages including Telugu, Kannada,  Tamil, Bengali, Odia, Bhojpuri, Nepali, Malayalam, Assamese, Bagheli and Maithili. He has won four National Film Awards and five Filmfare Awards with twenty nominations among many others. The Government of India awarded him the Padma Shri in 2009 and the Padma Bhushan in 2016 for his contribution to arts and culture. As many as 21 of his tracks feature in BBC's "Top 40 Bollywood Soundtracks of all time".

He got to sing with Mohammed Rafi in his Hindi playback debut in movie Unees-Bees in 1980 and also with Kishore Kumar in the 1980s. He finally made his mark in the 1988 movie Qayamat Se Qayamat Tak starring Aamir Khan and Juhi Chawla, his song "Papa Kehte Hain" was his notable performance which earned him his first Filmfare Award in the 1980s and he established himself in Bollywood Playback Singing. The soundtrack became one of the highest selling albums in the 1980s. The soundtrack was a breakthrough for the careers of Anand–Milind, as well as T-Series, one of India's leading record labels. after which he was one of the favourites of music directors. In the 1990s he sung for a thousands of songs including Hindi and Nepali languages.

Recognising his contribution, King of Nepal Birendra Bir Bikram Shah Dev awarded him with the Order of Gorkha Dakshina Bahu in 2001 after which for his contribution to Indian cinema and music, and Chitragupta Cineyatra Samman 2015 for his contribution to Bhojpuri cinema. He is the only male singer in the history of the Filmfare Awards to have won in over three decades (the 1980s, 1990s, and 2000s).

Early life
Udit Narayan Jha was born in a Maithil Brahmin family in 1955 to Nepali father Harekrishna Jha and Indian mother Bhuvaneshwari Jha. In 2009, when Udit Narayan was awarded India's civilian honour Padma Shri, there were reports questioning his Indian citizenship, claiming that he was born in Nepal. However, Udit Narayan himself branded these reports as "completely false", and stated that he was born in the Baisi village of Supaul district of Bihar at his maternal grandparents' home. When his acceptance of the Padma Shri led to his criticism in Nepal, he told the Nepalese daily Kantipur that he was "from Nepal but his mother's home was in Bihar." In a 2017 interview with the Indian magazine Outlook, he clarified that he was born in Baisi, and clarified that his father Harekrishna was a native of Bhardaha, Saptari District, Sagarmatha Zone, Nepal. In September 2018, Udit Narayan revealed at a ceremony held by the Bihar Jharkhand Association of North America, that he identifies as a Bihari.

Narayan studied at Jageshwar High School, Kunauli, Supaul, Bihar, India, where he finished his SSC and later obtained his intermediate degree from Ratna Rajya Lakshmi Campus, Kathmandu, Nepal. His father Harekrishna Jha was a farmer and his mother Bhuvneshwari Devi was a folk singer who encouraged his career.

Personal life 
In 2006, Ranjana Narayan claimed to be the Narayan's first wife, but Narayan consistently denied it. Later, he accepted her as his wife and promised to provide for her maintenance. Narayan has been married twice, first to Ranjana Narayan Jha and then to Deepa Narayan Jha. He began his relationship with Deepa Narayan while he was still married to Ranjana Narayan. Narayan and Deepa were married in 1985. With Deepa Narayan, he has one son, Aditya Narayan, who is also a playback singer.

Career
Narayan is one of the most prominent singers of Bollywood throughout the 1990s and early 2000s. He has been the on-screen singing voice for various Bollywood stars. He has sung for Bollywood actors Amitabh Bachchan, Rajesh Khanna, Dev Anand, Aamir Khan, Shah Rukh Khan, Salman Khan, Akshay Kumar and Ajay Devgn. Most of his duets are with Alka Yagnik. He began his career in 1970 as a Maithili folk singer (staff artist) for Radio Nepal, singing mostly popular folk songs in Maithili and Nepali. Gradually, he started singing modern Nepali songs. After eight years, Narayan moved to Bombay on a musical scholarship for Nepalese from the Indian Embassy in Nepal to study classical music at Bhartiya Vidya Bhavan.

Narayan started his Bollywood career in 1980 when he was noted by music director Rajesh Roshan, who asked Narayan to playback sing for the Hindi film Unees-Bees. Narayan was given the opportunity to sing with the singer Mohammed Rafi. He sang for Devanand a couplet in Swami Dada.His first duet was in the film Sannata.  Soon after, Narayan sang for a number of other movies, including Bade Dil Wala in 1983, where he sang a duet with senior singer Lata Mangeshkar, composed by senior music director R. D. Burman. In the same year, Narayan sang with Kishore Kumar in the film Kehdo Pyar Hai. Another singer he sang with was Suresh Wadkar with music composed by Bappi Lahiri.  A significant milestone in his career occurred in 1988 when Anand–Milind gave him the opportunity to sing all the songs for the Bollywood movie Qayamat Se Qayamat Tak, with Alka Yagnik, which earned him a Filmfare Award. In a 2014 interview with The Times of India, Narayan said: "The song I've sung, "Manzilein", is the best song of my career after "Pehla Nasha", which gave me superstardom!". Narayan remained prolific through the 2000s, singing numbers in films such as Pukar, Dhadkan, Lagaan, Devdas and Veer-Zaara

In 2002, Narayan sang "Bairi Piya" with newcomer Shreya Ghoshal, from the film Devdas, of which Rediff mentioned: "Narayan successfully captures the eternal romanticism of Devdas". In 2014, Narayan sang a song titled "Naa Hum Jo Kah De" along with Shreya Ghoshal, for the album Women's Day Special: Spreading Melodies Everywhere. The song was composed by Ram Shankar and penned by A. K. Mishra.

He competed with his closest professional rival Kumar Sanu who won five consecutive Filmfare awards in the 1990s.

Narayan's work has been praised by his contemporaries Alka Yagnik, Kavita Krishnamurthy and music director Ankit Tiwari. Mid-Day included him in the list of notable 90s playback singers. Narayan is considered one of the most prominent singers of his generation.

Other work
Narayan's friend Jiyand Nawab Deedag suggested he change his work from old to modern in order to be selected as a playback singer, but this did not work and, considering old films in 1973, Narayan sang a song for a Nepali film called Sindoor. This was a comedy song for the Nepali comedians GopalRaj Mainali (Chankhe) and Basundhara Bhushal (Nakkali). Narayan sang this song with Sushma Shrestha, now known as Poornima in Hindi films. Narayan has also acted in two Nepali films – Kusume Rumal and Pirati in 1985.
In 2004, he released his first non-movie Nepalese album, Upahaar, in which he sang duets with his wife Deepa Jha. Narayan has many solo albums as well, such as Bhajan Sangam, Bhajan Vatika, I Love You, Dil Deewana, Yeh Dosti, Love is Life, Jaanam,Jhumka de Jhumka, Sona No Ghadulo, Dhuli Ganga and Ma Tarini.

Narayan has performed in many stage shows in India and abroad and is the recipient of many awards. These include Screen Videocon Award, MTV Best Video Award and Pride of India Gold Award.
In 2010, Narayan with Madhushree sang for the English independent film When Harry Tries to Marry.

Narayan also sang the title song for the TV show Yeh Duniyan Gazab Ki, with Kumar Sanu. In 2015 he was involved in a mega series campaign Melancholy, where 421 Nepali artists had sung a 33 minutes 49-second long environmental song, in which 365 artists set a Guinness World Record on 19 May 2016 at Radio Nepal Studio, Singhadurbar, Kathamandu. It is written, composed and directed by environmentalist Nipesh DHAKA.

Television
Narayan was on the panel of judges of Indian Idol 3 in 2007 with music composer Anu Malik and playback singer Alisha Chinai on Sony TV.

Narayan was on the panel of judges on Sony TV for Waar Parriwar, a reality show based on the bringing together of a singing gharana (family of singers). He shared judging duties with fellow playback singer Kumar Sanu and Jatin Pandit of the music duo Jatin–Lalit.

Narayan has appeared on Jo Jeeta Wohi Super Star and Sa Re Ga Ma Pa L'il Champs as a guest.

As an actor
Udit Narayan Jha acted in and sang all the songs in a 1985 Nepali movie called Kusume Rumal which is one of the All Time Classics in Nepali movie industry starring himself with Bhuwan K.C. and Tripti Nadakar, which spent 25 weeks on the box office top ten list and became the highest-grossing Nepalese movie of all time until overtaken in 2001 by another Tulsi Ghimire film, Darpan Chaya.

Discography

Work with other singers 
Udit Narayan career started in 1980 and flourished during 90's. During the huge span of playback singing, other than the duet songs with notable female playback singers, Udit Narayan was fortunate to collaborate with playback singers from all generations. Udit Narayan debuted with legendary singer Mohammad Rafi and then got opportunity to share songs with Kishore Kumar, Amit Kumar, Suresh Wadkar, Mohammad Aziz and others during 80's. Most of his male duets are with Kumar Sanu & Abhijeet. Some of the selected and notable songs are as follows

Awards and nominations

Narayan has won four National Film Awards and five Filmfare Awards.

Jury member of awards
In 2012, Narayan was the one of the jury members of the film music jury for the Global Indian Music Academy Awards In 2015, he was one of the jury members in Mirchi Music Awards, and the same year he was the judge of the Jagran Film Festival.

Civil honours

 Prabal Gorkha Dakshina Bahu, Fourth Class of Prestigious Order of Gorkha Dakshina Bahu (Order of Gorkha Right Arm), one of the highest civil honours in Nepal, by the King of Nepal Birendra Bir Bikram Shah Dev, 2001
 Padma Bhushan : third highest civil honour from Indian Government, 2016
Madhya Pradesh government's National Lata Mangeshkar Award, 2015
 National Bravery Award from Maharashtra at Raj Bhavan 2016
 Padma Shri : fourth highest civil honour from Indian Government, 2009
 Honoured at Swabhimani Mumbaikar Awards, 2016
 Special Jury Salute Award from Radio Mirchi Award, 2016
 Receiving the Kishore Kumar Memorial Award for Music from S. Krishna Kumar
 Dr. Ambedkar Awards in Mumbai, 2015
 Awarded for his exceptional performance Bhojpuri industry, 2015
 Received BIFA awards, 2015
 1st, Chitragupta Cineyatra Film Award, 2015
 Bhojpuri award, 2014
 Maharashtra Ratna Awards from Government of Maharashtra 2011
 First Mohammed Rafi award, 2010
 2nd Medscape India National Awards
 Chitragupta Cineyatra Samman for Bhojpuri Cinema, 2015 
 Received Samrat Vikramaditya Sangeet Alankaran Samman, 2006

Outstanding honours and awards
 Big Entertainment Award 2017 Udit Narayan won the 92.7FM Suhana Safar Legend Award
 Mirchi Music Awards 2016 Jury Special Salute

International honours and awards
 International Brandlaureate Personality Award from Malaysia, 2011

Lifetime achievement awards 
 Lifetime Achievement Award from Kalashri Award, 2010
 Sahara Awadh Samman Awardee, 2006
 Lifetime Achievement Award from Suryadatta National Awards, 2016

See also
 List of Indian playback singers

References

External links

 
 

 
Living people
Bhajan singers
Bollywood playback singers
Nepali-language singers from India
Hindi-language singers
Indian male playback singers
Odia playback singers
Tamil playback singers
Kannada playback singers
Order of Gorkha Dakshina Bahu
Recipients of the Padma Shri in arts
Telugu playback singers
Recipients of the Padma Bhushan in arts
1955 births
Best Male Playback Singer National Film Award winners
Filmfare Awards winners
Screen Awards winners
International Indian Film Academy Awards winners
Mithila
Indian people of Nepalese descent
Ratna Rajya Laxmi Campus alumni
Zee Cine Awards winners